Strongest Deliveryman is a 2017 South Korean television series starring Go Kyung-pyo, Chae Soo-bin, Kim Seon-ho, and Go Won-hee. It premiered on August 4, 2017, and aired every Friday and Saturday at 23:00 (KST) on KBS2 until September 23, 2017.

Synopsis
Choi Kang-soo is a deliveryman who wants to become the CEO of his own delivery app company. The series tells of his journey to achieving love and success.

Cast

Main
Go Kyung-pyo as Choi Kang-soo
A veteran deliveryman who puts his life on the line at whatever he does.
Chae Soo-bin as Lee Dan-ah
A delivery woman who is so single-minded about making money and escaping from "Hell Joseon" that she turns down all advances from men.
Kim Seon-ho as Oh Jin-kyu
A rich man's son, the former Head Manager of Jung Family Seollongtang, he is stubborn at first but changes later.
Go Won-hee as Lee Ji-yoon
The daughter of the Jung Family Foods' CEO. She wants to become independent, so runs away from home.

Supporting

People around Kang-soo
Kim Kyung-nam as Sung-jae
Kang-soo's friend who is also a deliveryman.
 as Baek Gong-gi
A martial artist who is a leader of the Holy Noodles deliverymen. He is loyal to Kang-soo.
 as Min-chan
He attended a good college but has not gotten a job, she becomes a deliveryman.
 as Byung-soo
A Holy Noodles deliveryman who is on Kang-soo's side.
Jung Ik-han as Young-taek
A Holy Noodles deliveryman who is caring to his younger sister.
Kim Min-seok as Ho-young
A deliveryman at Holy Noodles who is loyal to Gong-gi.
Ye Soo-jung as Jeong-im
The owner of Hanyang Seollongtang, Hyun-soo's grandmother, who is caring to Kang-soo and his friends.
 as Hyun-soo
Kang-soo's friend that turns out to be Kang-soo's younger brother.
Lee Yu-ri as Yoon Hwa-young
A web developer who helped Kang-soo.

People around Dan-ah
Jo Hee-bong as Jang Dong-soo
The chef and boss in Lively Handmade Noodles. He is a former gang boss.
Lee Min-young as Soon-ae
Dong-soo's assistant in the noodle house. She is the daughter of a rich man.
Nam Ji-hyun as Choi Yeon-ji
Dan-ah's friend and housemate. She works at a karaoke bar.
Oh Yoon-hong
Lee Dan-ah's mother

People around Jin-gyu
Lee Won-jong as Oh Sung-hwan
Jin-kyu's father and the CEO of Ohsung Group.
Lee Kan-hee as Jung Sook
Jin-kyu's mother.
 as Oh Sung-gyu
Jin-kyu's brother.

People around Ji-yoon
Kim Hye-ri as Jung Hye-rin
Ji-yoon's mother and the CEO of Jung Family Foods. She is an antagonist in the series.
Sunwoo Jae-duk as Lee Jang-jin
Ji-yoon's father.
Yoo Ji-hyun as Coffee World's manager

Extended cast
Lee Hang-na as Hyeon-soo's mother	
N/A as Jong-hyun
N/A as So-hyun
Park Sung-joon as Yoon-cheol
 as Team leader
Lee Myung-hoon as Department Head Park

Cameo appearances
Jo Hyun-sik as a postman injured in a traffic accident
 as a hit-and-run driver
 as Choi Kang-soo's father

Production
Strongest Deliveryman was produced by Jidam Inc. for KBS. Jidam also produced Jang Bo-ri Is Here!, My Daughter, Geum Sa-wol and Mrs. Cop 2 as well as the KBS daily dramas Ruby Ring and Two Mothers.

Yoon Shi-yoon was offered the lead role, but declined because of a conflict with filming the drama Hit the Top.

Originally, Jang Mi-kwan and Lee Yeol-eum were set to play the second lead characters, Oh Jin-gyu and Lee Ji-yoon, but there was a change in casting and the roles were given to Kim Seon-ho and Go Won-hee. The producer of Strongest Deliveryman explained that Jang Mi-kwan left the cast due to disagreements.

Soundtrack

Part 1

Part 2

Part 3

Part 4

Part 5

Part 6

Part 7

Part 8

Part 9

Part 10

Part 11

Part 12

Ratings 
 In this table, the blue numbers represent the lowest ratings and the red numbers represent the highest ratings.
NR denotes that the drama did not rank in the top 20 daily programs on that date.

Notes

Awards and nominations

References

External links
  
 

2017 South Korean television series debuts
2017 South Korean television series endings
Korean Broadcasting System television dramas
Korean-language television shows
South Korean comedy-drama television series
South Korean romance television series